Paranoid Park (2006) is a young adult novel by Blake Nelson.

Plot
A 16-year-old skateboarder who tries to fit in with the skater crowd accidentally kills a security guard while trying to board a train. Much of the plot concerns the character struggling to cope with what he has done while also trying to avoid being caught. The author has said that the book is a retelling of Crime and Punishment in a young adult fiction setting. The novel takes place in Portland, Oregon, United States.

Film adaptation
The novel has been adapted into a film by director Gus Van Sant, released in 2007, also called Paranoid Park.

References

2006 American novels
American young adult novels
Novels set in Portland, Oregon
Skateboarding
Novels by Blake Nelson
American novels adapted into films
Viking Press books